Győri ETO Futsal Club is a Hungarian futsal club from Győr, that plays in the Nemzeti Bajnokság I.

History 
Founded in 2006 as Unihall FC, the team entered the second division in its inaugural year and immediately won promotion to the top division. In 2008 banking company Duna Takarék joined the club as a naming sponsor, and with their support ETO reached the NB I playoffs first time in their history. Building on that success, the team further strengthened their squad for the following year and finally went to win the title in 2010. They also collected the Hungarian cup and Hungarian supercup title, thus becoming one of the most dominant sides in the domestic futsal just in a few years.

Currently, the team is officially known as Rába ETO Futsal Club due to sponsorship reasons.

Honours 

Nemzeti Bajnokság I:
Winners (8) – record: 2010, 2011, 2012, 2013, 2015, 2016, 2017, 2018
Magyar Kupa:
Winners (4): 2010, 2011, 2013, 2014
Szuperkupa:
Winners (4): 2010, 2011, 2012, 2013

Team

Current squad 
As of 17 April 2018 

 1  Marcell Alasztics
 3  Mátyás Varjú
 5  Bence Papp
 6  Bence Klacsák
 8  Ádám Tama
 9  Gerard Gonzalez Martinez
 10  Alejandro Constantino Viñas
 12  Juan Ramón Calvo Rodríguez
 14  Kristóf Sáhó
 15  Richárd Dávid
 17  Bognár Bálint
 66  Gábor Klcsó
 69  Ádám Szűcs

Technical staff 
  Head Coach: Javi Rodríguez
  Coach: Attila Molnár
  Club Doctor: Jenő Szűcs, MD
  Masseur: Nikolett Szórádi
  Technical Assistant: Dóra Tillinger

Administrative staff 

  President: Zoltán Drucskó
  Honorary President: Péter Bolla
  Sports Director: Péter Hannich
  Club Manager: Attila Molnár
  General Secretary: Henrietta Nagy
  General Secretary Assistant: Klaudia Madarász
  Marketing Manager: Tamás Darázs
  Press and Webadmin: Attila Herman

References

External links 
 Official website
 Club profile on the UEFA official website

Sport in Győr
Futsal clubs in Hungary
Futsal clubs established in 2006
2006 establishments in Hungary